Moon Valley may refer to:

Places
Moon Valley (Independence Township, Michigan), a valley in Oakland County, Michigan, United States
Moon Valley, Phoenix, a neighborhood in Phoenix, Arizona, United States
Moon Valley, Wisconsin, an unincorporated community in Merrimac, Wisconsin, United States

Other uses
Pilea 'Moon Valley', a cultivar of the ornamental plant Pilea mollis
Moon Valley High School, a high school in Phoenix, Arizona, United States

See also
List of valleys on the Moon
Meon Valley (disambiguation)
Valley of the Moon (disambiguation)